Jacob van der Sluys or Sluis (c.1660 – September 15, 1732) was a Dutch Golden Age painter.

Sluys was born in Leiden and spent his childhood at the orphanage, for which he made several paintings still located there. He was registered in the Leiden Guild of St. Luke as a pupil of Jacob Toorenvliet and Pieter Cornelisz van Slingelandt.

Sluys served in several roles for the Leiden guild after his marriage. He is known for portraits and allegories. He died in Leiden.

References 

1660s births
1732 deaths
Artists from Leiden
Dutch Golden Age painters
Painters from Leiden